Woodville railway station is a former railway station on the Swadlincote Loop Line which served the village of Woodville, Derbyshire, England.

Opening
The first station to serve Woodville was located on the Hartshorne Road but the station was moved following the opening of the Swadlincote Loop Line and was moved further south of the first station which became a goods station. There was also a railway station in the Castle Gresley settlement quite a distance from the village. This section was authorised under the Midland Railway (Leicester and Swannington Alteration) Act of 1846 and although recorded as opening to passengers in 1851 much of the line had been completed by as early as September 1849.

Usage

Closure

Regular passenger services were withdrawn from the line in 1947 but Summer Saturday service to Blackpool continued until 8 September 1962. The line remained in use for industrial traffic until 1964 when the line was closed and dismantled in 1965.

Present day
There is not much evidence left of the Woodville section of Swadlincote Loop Line. It has mostly been built on by housing and turned into footpaths. The original station is now in use for an industrial company. The second station has since been demolished and built on. The trackbed to Moira is traceable but mostly lost under development.

Map

References

Disused railway stations in Derbyshire
Former Midland Railway stations
Railway stations in Great Britain opened in 1851
Railway stations in Great Britain closed in 1947
1851 establishments in England
1947 disestablishments in England